Khirala Sharif Dargah is a Dargah (tomb) or monument of Sayyed Mohammed Badiuddin Zia-ul-Haq Qadri Shattari located in Khirala village in the Khandwa District of Madhya Pradesh state, India.

References

Dargahs in India